Una Kang Naging Akin is a 1991 Philippine neo noir crime drama film directed by Laurice Guillen and written by Helen Meriz and Orlando Nadres.

Plot 
The story starts with Nicolas Adriano (Gabby Concepcion) and Vanessa Yumol (Dawn Zulueta), Manila’s  couple of the century. Before their wedding, tragedy strikes when the chopper that Nick is driving crashes and burns in the jungles of Palawan. Nick had forgotten who he is, and meets a beautiful artist named Diosa (Sharon Cuneta). Nick had an amnesia and completely forgets Vanessa. He had fallen in love with Diosa and married her. However, when Niick started regaining his memory, and had forgotten about Diosa after experiencing another accident.

Cast 
 Sharon Cuneta as Diosa Mallari
 Gabby Concepcion as Nick/Darwin 
 Dawn Zulueta as Vanessa
 Charito Solis as Agnes
 Eddie Gutierrez as Dr. Mallari 
 Michael de Mesa as Ely
 Armida Siguion-Reyna as Doña Margarita Soriano

Production 
The film was produced by Viva films. The hit soundtrack “Kung Kailangan Mo Ako” was composed by Rey Valera and arranged by Willy Cruz.

TV Adaptation 

In 2008, the series was adapted by GMA Network as the tenth instalment of Sine Novela. Directed by Joel Lamangan, it starred Angelika Dela Cruz, Wendell Ramos, and Maxene Magalona.

Awards and nominations

References

External links 
 

Films directed by Laurice Guillen
Filipino-language films